Fidjeri (Arabic: الفجيري; sometimes spelled fijri or fidjeri) is the specific repertoire of vocal music sung by the pearl divers of Eastern Arabia's coastal Gulf states, especially Bahrain and Kuwait. A lead singer is backed up by a chorus of accompanying singers and clapping. The accompanying instruments to a fidjeri ensemble are a small double-sided hand-drum, known as the mirwās and the jāhlah, a clay pot played with both hands.

There are eight genres of fijiri: Sanginni (sung on the beach, not on the boat), Bahri, Adsani, Mkholfi, Haddadi, Hasawi, Zumayya, and Dan, the last two actually being subgenres of Hasawi and Mkholfi respectively. Bahri and Adsani are the two main genres. Pearl diver singers are referred to in Arabic as nahham.

Salem Allan and Ahmad Butabbaniya are two of the most well-known fijiri singers from Bahrain.

See also
Music of Bahrain
Music of Kuwait
 Culture of Eastern Arabia
 Sawt (music)
 Liwa (music)
 Pearl diving

References

Further reading

External links
Youtube clip of The Ghalali traditional music and dance group performing a Fijiri song in a village near Muharraq, Bahrain, October 7 2009
Audio samples of Salem Allan and Ahmad Butabbanya on Zeryab.com

Bahraini music
Arabic music
Kuwaiti music
Arab culture
Pearls
Emirati music